This is a list of the 64 members of the European Parliament for Spain in the 1999 to 2004 session.

List

Notes

Spain
List
1999